Anthony James "A.B." Brown (born December 4, 1965) is a former American football running back who played for the West Virginia Mountaineers in collegiate play and played for the New York Jets in the National Football League (NFL). He also played RB for the Salem High School Rams.

Collegiate career
Brown, a transfer from Big East rival Pittsburgh, was one of the premiere backs for the Mountaineers during their 1988 run to the National Championship, where they lost to the Notre Dame Fighting Irish. Brown, along with Undra Johnson and Eugene Napoleon, made up the great depth at running back. Brown, whose final game as a Pitt Panther was his 100-yard performance against the Mountaineers, ranks as one of the more memorable backs in West Virginia University. In his senior year, Brown led West Virginia with 913 yards on 167 carries.

After his senior year at West Virginia, Brown entered the 1989 NFL Draft. Seen by many NFL teams as a highly coveted running back with great potential, Brown was projected as a late first-round to early second-round pick, but in the days before the draft Brown unexpectedly dropped on the draft boards to the eighth-round for unknown reasons.

Professional career and life after football 
Brown was selected by the Jets in the eighth round of the 1989 NFL Draft. As a professional in the NFL, A.B. rushed for a career 117 yards with a touchdown in his four-season career with the New York Jets.

Personal life and endorsements 
Brown was born on December 4, 1965, in Salem, New Jersey, to Henry Wright Sr.and Shirley Brown. He also has a brother Steve Brown A.K.A. "Fly D".

References

External links
Bio from 1992 Jets yearbook

1965 births
Living people
American football running backs
New York Jets players
People from Salem, New Jersey
Pittsburgh Panthers football players
Players of American football from New Jersey
Salem High School (New Jersey) alumni
Sportspeople from Salem County, New Jersey
West Virginia Mountaineers football players